Hennos Asmelash (Geʽez: ሐንኖስ ኣስመላሽ; born 1 July 1999) is a Dutch professional footballer who plays as a right-back for Polish III liga club Wieczysta Kraków.

Club career
Asmelash made his professional debut in the Eredivisie for ADO Den Haag on 14 January 2017 in a game against SC Heerenveen. After two loans at TOP Oss, Asmelash was released by ADO and became a free agent on 1 July 2020.

On 1 March 2021, Asmelash signed with Ukrainian Premier League club Inhulets Petrove.

On 3 January 2023, Asmelash joined Polish fourth division side Wieczysta Kraków on a year-and-a-half contract, with an extension option.

International career
Asmelash was born in the Netherlands to Eritrean parents. He was a youth international for the Netherlands at the U16 and U18 levels.

References

External links
 
 

1999 births
Living people
Dutch people of Eritrean descent
Dutch footballers
Dutch expatriate footballers
Netherlands youth international footballers
Eredivisie players
Eerste Divisie players
Ukrainian Premier League players

ADO Den Haag players
TOP Oss players
FC Inhulets Petrove players
Wieczysta Kraków players
Footballers from Delft
Association football fullbacks
Expatriate footballers in Ukraine
Dutch expatriate sportspeople in Ukraine
Expatriate footballers in Poland
Dutch expatriate sportspeople in Poland